Margarites hickmanae, common name the Hickman margarite, is a species of sea snail, a marine gastropod mollusk in the family Margaritidae.

Description
The height of the shell attains 10 mm.

Distribution
This marine species  occurs off the Aleutians.

References

 McLean J.H. (1984) New species of Northeast Pacific archaeogastropods. The Veliger 26(3): 233-239

External links
 To Encyclopedia of Life
 To USNM Invertebrate Zoology Mollusca Collection
 To ITIS
 To World Register of Marine Species

hickmanae
Gastropods described in 1984